The McMaster Institute of Environment and Health (MIEH), established in 1996, is a special program at McMaster University. The goal of MIEH is to facilitate, promote, and publish environmental health research. Research and study the complex relationships between the environment and human health.

McMaster University